The poacher's gun was, as its name suggests, an easily concealable firearm predominantly used by poachers in Northern England from the 18th until the early 20th century for bagging rabbits and other small game. The contemporary cane gun had a similar function, but it was designed to resemble a walking stick rather than for compactness and ease of concealment.

18th century
The first poachers' guns were built around a military surplus flintlock horse pistol. Muzzle loading guns of this type were both common and relatively affordable for a working-class man as these were frequently brought back by soldiers returning from the wars with the French, and either sold or exchanged for gin at one of the many pawn shops or taverns. The Industrial revolution equipped workers with what had previously been considered advanced metalworking skills. With tools smuggled home from the workplace such as a tap and die and a few files, any resourceful man or boy could create his own concealable hunting weapon. The original poacher's gun had a threaded barrel extension and a detachable buttstock similar to a modern takedown gun. The three parts were concealed in the owner's coat until needed, so if he was seen by a gamekeeper or constable he would be less likely to be arrested for armed trespass. This was a serious crime during the 18th century that was usually punished with transportation to Australia.

19th century
As technology improved during the Victorian era, more advanced types of poacher's gun were commercially produced for use with paper and brass cartridges. Rifled barrels also started to be developed. Poachers guns of this era included folding break action rook rifles or .410 shotguns with a barrel that was the same length as the buttstock. Guns of this type were used not only by poachers, but also by farmers for vermin control, and children learning to shoot.

Modern use
The .22 Armalite AR-7 survival rifle issued to Israeli Defence Force pilots and American air crews is similar in function to the early poachers' guns. The receiver, magazine and barrel can be dismounted and stored in the buttstock. A civilian version that can be attached to a backpack is popular among hikers, fishermen and survivalists in America.

See also
 Alarm gun, a crude tripwire activated blunderbuss used during the 18th century to frighten or maim poachers and grave robbers.

References

Hunting rifles
Flintlock firearms
18th-century weapons
Victorian-era weapons